Seacoast is an American non-denominational  megachurch located in Mount Pleasant, South Carolina; a suburb of Charleston.  Seacoast was one of the churches who pioneered the multi-site church technique. Josh Surratt is the Lead Pastor. Seacoast Church has 13 different locations around South Carolina and North Carolina. Greg Surratt is the founding pastor and father of Josh Surratt. The main campus is located in Mount Pleasant on Long Point Road. Seacoast is a “mega church” and is one of the biggest churches in South Carolina. It is also a key member of a church planting organization called ARC (Association of Related Churches).

History 
The church began in February 1988 with 100 people meeting in an apartment clubhouse by Greg Surratt and a team from Northwood Assembly, another large church in North Charleston. In April of the same year the first 'public' meetings were held in a rented theater with a vision for reaching out to the unchurched people of the Charleston area.  The church grew quickly with its contemporary worship style and support from its mother church, Northwood Assembly.  The church has over 10,000 worshipers who attend weekly. Surratt continues to serve as Founding and Teaching Pastor, while his son Josh Surratt serves as Lead Pastor.

The church’s multi-site concept came out of necessity. In 2002, the church had over 3,000 people attending weekly services, leading them to request permits to expand their facilities with local officials. The town of Mount Pleasant denied all requests, however. The church then began to use a video feed to show sermons to an off-site location. This was so successful that Seacoast began to open other "satellite" facilities throughout the Charleston metropolitan area and throughout the state and now in North Carolina.

In 2006 the church's original campus in Mount Pleasant, South Carolina opened a new  facility that provides different service styles for people who have different preferences in music and worship. The services, outside the original facility, are a live worship experience with video teaching recorded at the original campus using the multi-site church philosophy for which Seacoast is recognized.

Seacoast currently has 14 campuses in two states.

Beliefs 
Seacoast is a non-denominational Christian church and states its "sole basis for [its] belief is the Bible." The statement of faith is Trinitarian and states that the Bible is infallible. The statement affirms the belief that Jesus Christ "lived a sinless life on earth and voluntarily paid for our sin by dying on the cross as our substitute." and that "He rose from the dead and is the only mediator between us and God."

References

News articles
 Politics from the pulpit archived.

External links
 Seacoast Church
 Greg Surratt's Blog

Churches in Charleston County, South Carolina
Churches in South Carolina
Evangelical megachurches in the United States
Christian organizations established in 1988
20th-century Protestant churches
Non-denominational Evangelical multisite churches